Sydenham is a suburb west of central Durban, South Africa.

Sydenham added to Durban Municipality

References

Suburbs of Durban
Populated places in eThekwini Metropolitan Municipality